Rotonda de los Hombres Ilustres (Rotunda of Illustrious Men) is a victory column in Chihuahua, Chih., Mexico. It is there in honor of important men in Chihuahua's history. The landmark is a column with a Winged Victory on top.

The men buried there are:

 Bernardo Revilla  1798-1879
 Gral. Angel Trías  1809-1867
 Cor. Jesus José Casavantes  1809-1884
 Lic. Laureano Muñoz 1815-1883
 José Eligio Muñoz  1819-1891 
 Profr. Jose María Mari 1820-1899
 Cadete Agustín Melgar  1829-1847
 Cor. Joaquín Terrazas  1829-1901
 Cor. Angel Peralta  1830-1876
 Gral. Manuel Ojinaga  1833-1865
 Abraham González  1864-1913
 Gral. Toribio Ortega  1870-1914
 Daniel Muñoz Lumbier
 Cayetano Justiniani
 Gral. Miguel Ahumada 1844-1917
 Práxedis Guerrero

References

Landmarks in Chihuahua (state)
Buildings and structures in Chihuahua (state)
Monuments and memorials in Mexico
Chihuahua City
Cemeteries in Mexico